The 2007 season was the 102nd season of competitive football in Norway.

Men's football

League season

Promotion and relegation

Tippeligaen

1. divisjon

2. divisjon

3. divisjon

Norwegian Cup

Final

Women's football

League season

Promotion and relegation

Toppserien

1. divisjon

Norwegian Women's Cup

Final
 Asker 2–4 Kolbotn

Men's UEFA competitions

Champions League

Qualifying rounds

Second qualifying round

|}

Third qualifying round

|}

Group stage

Group B

UEFA Cup

Qualifying rounds

First qualifying round

|}

Second qualifying round

|}

First round

|}

Group stage

Group D

Final phase

Round of 32

|}

Intertoto Cup
No Norwegian teams participated this season.

UEFA Women's Cup

Second qualifying round

Group B4

Matches (Played in Lyon and Bron, France)
 Kolbotn 3–1 Sparta Prague
 Lyon 1–0 Kolbotn
 Kolbotn 0–1 Brøndby

National teams

Norway men's national football team

UEFA Euro 2008 qualifying

Group C

Fixtures and results

Key
 H = Home match
 A = Away match
 N = Neutral site match

Norway women's national football team

Notes and references

 
Seasons in Norwegian football